Matvey Georgiyevich Korobov (born 7 January 1983) is a Russian professional boxer. He challenged once for the WBO middleweight title in 2014, as well as the WBC interim middleweight title in 2018 and the WBA interim middleweight title in 2019. As an amateur he won consecutive gold medals at the 2005 and 2007 World Championships, and gold at the 2005 Boxing World Cup; all in the middleweight division.

Amateur career
Korobov won the European junior title in 2001.

He became Russian champion in 2003 and 2004 but did not participate in the 2004 Summer Olympics as his country chose to send Gaydarbek Gaydarbekov, who had lost to him but eventually won Olympic gold.

He won the world championships in 2005 against Emilio Correa and the European Championships in 2006, defeating Oleksandr Usyk. He calls his World Cup win over Cuban Yordanis Despaigne the hardest fight of his amateur career, he helped to edge out a 6:5 team win.

In 2005 he was part of the Russian team that won the 2005 Boxing World Cup.

He once again won the world title by easily beating Sergiy Derevyanchenko and dominating Alfonso Blanco in 2007 by a score of PTS 29:4.

At the 2008 Summer Olympics he was off-form and was upset in his second bout by Bakhtiyar Artayev. He decided to turn pro afterwards. His record was 300-12.

World Amateur championship results 
2005
Defeated Dzhakhon Kurbanov (Tajikistan) RSC
Defeated Jarrod Fletcher (Australia) RSC
Defeated Darren Sutherland (Ireland) RSCO 3
Defeated Emilio Correa (Cuba) 49-25
Defeated Ismail Syllakh (Ukraine) RSCO 2

2007
Defeated Francy Ntetu (Canada) RSC 3
Defeated Hamyoun Amiri (Irán) RSCO 3
Defeated Carlos Góngora (Ecuador) RSCO 3
Defeated Wang Jianzheng (China) 22-3
Defeated Sergiy Derevyanchenko (Ukraine) AB 2
Defeated Alfonso Blanco (boxer) (Venezuela) 29-4

Olympic results 
2008
Defeated Naim Terbunja (Albania) 18-6
Lost to Bakhtiyar Artayev (Kazakhstan) 7-10

Professional career 
In his first world title fight on 13 December 2014, Korobov faced Andy Lee for the vacant WBO middleweight title. Even though he was doing well for the first five rounds, the Russian-born would end up hurt and then knocked out in the sixth round, losing his opportunity to become a world champion for the first time in his career.

On 22 December 2018, WBC middleweight champion Jermall Charlo was slated to defend his belt against Willie Monroe Jr. However, Monroe Jr's VADA tests came out positive for a banned substance, which meant a new opponent for Charlo was in the works. Korobov ended up being the substitution and gave Charlo a very tough fight, however, was still unable to come out with the win. Korobov started the fight really strong, but gave up the latter part to the WBC champion.

After a controversial majority draw against Immanuwel Aleem, Korobov, WBA's number #3 at middleweight at the time would go on to fight WBA's #1, Chris Eubank Jr. for the vacant WBA interim middleweight title, which was also the final eliminator for the full WBA middleweight title. Korobov lost the fight by a second-round TKO after suffering an injury to his left shoulder.

Professional boxing record

References

External links

2001 results
Interview by Fightnews
Matt Korobov at PremierBoxingChampions
Matt Korobov - Profile, News Archive & Current Rankings at Box.Live

Boxers at the 2008 Summer Olympics
Olympic boxers of Russia
1983 births
People from Yagodninsky District
Middleweight boxers
Living people
Russian male boxers
AIBA World Boxing Championships medalists
Sportspeople from Magadan Oblast